This list of African Americans inventors and scientists documents many of the African-Americans who have invented a multitude of items or made discoveries in the course of their lives. These have ranged from practical everyday devices to applications and scientific discoveries in diverse fields, including physics, biology, math, and medicine.

African-Americans have been the victims of oppression, discrimination and persecution throughout American history, with an impact on African-American innovation. A 2014 study by economist Lisa D. Cook linked violence towards African-Americans and lack of legal protections over the period 1870–1940 to lower innovation. Despite this, many black innovators have been responsible for a large number of major inventions.

Among the earliest was George Washington Carver, whose reputation was based on his research into and promotion of alternative crops to cotton, which aided in nutrition for farm families. He wanted poor farmers to grow alternative crops both as a source of their own food and as a source of other products to improve their way of life. The most popular of his 44 practical bulletins for farmers contained 105 food recipes using peanuts. He also developed and promoted about 100 products made from peanuts that were useful for the house and farm. He received numerous honors for his work, including the Spingarn Medal of the NAACP.

A later renowned scientist was Percy Lavon Julian, a research chemist and a pioneer in the chemical synthesis of medicinal drugs from plants. He was the first to synthesize the natural product physostigmine, and a pioneer in the industrial large-scale chemical synthesis of the human hormones, steroids, progesterone, and testosterone, from plant sterols such as stigmasterol and sitosterol. His work would lay the foundation for the steroid drug industry's production of cortisone, other corticosteroids, and birth control pills.

A contemporary example of a modern-day inventor is Lonnie George Johnson, an engineer. Johnson invented the Super Soaker water gun, which was the top-selling toy in the United States from 1991 to 1992. In 1980 Johnson formed his own law firm and licensed the Super Soaker water gun to Larami Corporation. Two years later, the Super Soaker generated over $200 million in retail sales and became the best selling toy in America. Larami Corporation was eventually purchased by Hasbro, the second largest toy manufacturer in the world. Over the years, Super Soaker sales have totaled close to one billion dollars. Johnson reinvested a majority of his earnings from the Super Soaker into research and development for his energy technology companies – "It's who I am, it's what I do." As of 2019, Johnson holds over 120 patents, with more pending, and is the author of several publications on spacecraft power systems.

See also 

 Lists of African Americans
 List of inventors
 History of United States patent law
 Lemelson–MIT Prize
 NASA spinoff
 National Inventors Hall of Fame
 Science and technology in the United States
 Technological and industrial history of the United States
 Timeline of United States discoveries
 Timeline of United States inventions
 United States patent law
 United States Patent and Trademark Office
 Yankee ingenuity
 African American women in computer science
 African-American women in medicine
 List of African-American women in STEM fields
 List of African-American mathematicians
 List of African scientists, inventors, and scholars
 African-American dance
 Asian Americans in science and technology

References

External links 
 The Faces of Science: African Americans in the Sciences
 The Black Inventor Online Museum 
 LittleAfrica.com website
  Black Lives in Astronomy: Guide to Black Astronomers
 Top List of Black Inventions That Changed The World

 
 Inventors
Inventors
Lists of inventors